Georges Piroué (5 August 1920, La Chaux-de-Fonds – 7 January 2005, Dampierre-sur-Loire near Saumur age 84) was a Swiss writer.

Biography 
After studying literature and a doctorate at the University of Neuchâtel, Georges Piroué left for Paris.

After he published two collections of poetry, Nature sans rivage (1951) and Chansons à dire (1953), he turned to the writing of short stories.
 
He became a literary advisor and set up a translation department for the authors of Southern Italy and Sicily at the Éditions Denoël, which published almost all his texts from 1960 to 1985.

Prizes  
1966: 
1979: Prix Littéraire Valery Larbaud for Feux et lieux

Bibliography (selection)

Short stories 
1961: Ariane, ma sanglante 
1966: Ces Eaux qui ne vont nulle part
1969: La Façade et autres miroirs 
1979: Feux et lieux
1989: Madame double étoile
1992: L'Herbe tendre

Novels 
1962: Une manière de durer 
1972: La vie supposée de Théodore Nèfle
1976: San Rocco et ses fêtes
1981: À sa seule gloire : fragments d’une autre vie

Essais 
1960: Proust et la musique du devenir
1967: Pirandello
1985: Lui, Hugo 
1997: Mémoires d’un lecteur heureux

External links 
 Georges Piroué 
 Georges Piroué : bibliography on Culturactif

Swiss writers in French
Swiss poets in French
Swiss male novelists
Swiss essayists
Prix Valery Larbaud winners
University of Neuchâtel alumni
1920 births
People from La Chaux-de-Fonds
2005 deaths
20th-century essayists